The British Army Rugby League team is the official rugby league team representing the British Army. The team was founded in 1994 when the Army first recognised rugby league as an official sport and lifted a ban on it. The new team was able to play in the Challenge Cup. The team play their home matches at Aldershot Military Stadium in Aldershot, Hampshire. An Army women's team was set up in 2019.

History 
Historically, rugby league had been banned in the British Armed Forces due to the strength of rugby union and the Rugby Football Union's demands that anyone playing rugby league would be banned from playing rugby union. During the Second World War, the Northern Command Sports Board (NCSB) held sympathy towards Northern soldiers who wished to play rugby league. They set up a number of matches between unofficial army representative teams and Northern clubs. This arrangement only lasted until the end of the war when the Army ended a relaxation on the ban and because the NCSB did not wish to try to challenge the primacy of the Army Rugby Union.

The ban was lifted in 1994 following an announcement by the Armed Forces Minister Jeremy Hanley. The new team was founded by Martin Coyd of the Royal Engineers. Due to the wide array of British Army deployments worldwide, the British Army do not play in a league in the English rugby league system. Occasionally they have players from the Army Rugby Union cross codes to play in their matches.

As a result of the ban being lifted, the men's team became eligible to enter the Challenge Cup. Initially in 1999, the Rugby Football League (RFL) were only going to allow the winners of the Inter-Services competition (which the Army won) to enter in the 2000 Challenge Cup but they were eventually persuaded that all three of the services teams were able to enter.  The team's best result was to reach the fourth round of the 2020 Challenge Cup, the highest for a forces team since 2010 when the Royal Navy reached the third round. The Army Women team won the Challenge Shield in 2019 However none of the military teams took part in the 2021 Challenge Cup because the RFL decided that only professional Rugby League teams would be allowed to compete because of the COVID-19 pandemic. In January 2022, the British Army were drawn against the Royal Navy in the Challenge Cup for the first time in the competition since their inaugural appearances.

Challenge Cup

Women's Challenge Cup

Women's Super League South

Notes

References 

Rugby league in the United Kingdom
Sport in the British Army
1994 establishments in the United Kingdom
Rugby league teams in Hampshire